Lord Saman-Ana (from Sumerian Saman-Ana: high vessal) in Sumerian religion was one of the Heroes slain by Ninurta, patron god of Lagash, in ancient Iraq. Almost nothing else is mentioned of this "hero", his appearance is lacking.

See also
Ninlil
Sumerian religion
Anzû

References

External links
 The Electronic Text Corpus of Sumerian Literature

Characters in Mesopotamian mythology